I Know a Secret or I Know the Secret may refer to:

I Know a Secret, film directed by Bruce Pittman 1982
I Know a Secret, List of programs broadcast by ABC Television
I Know a Secret (Ginny Owens album) 2014
I Know a Secret, compilation album by Erskine Hawkins
I Know the Secret, album by Medical Mission Sisters 1967
"I Know the Secret", title song from the album by Medical Mission Sisters 1967
"I Know a Secret", song by Erskine Hawkins, covered by Spike Jones